As of 2020, South Australia has 3 grid-connected energy storage devices, with a total capacity of 205 MW / 253.5 MWh.

Table

References 

Energy storage projects